Application security (short AppSec) includes all tasks that introduce a secure software development life cycle to development teams. Its final goal is to improve security practices and, through that, to find, fix and preferably prevent security issues within applications. It encompasses the whole application life cycle from requirements analysis, design, implementation, verification as well as maintenance.

Approaches
Different approaches will find different subsets of the security vulnerabilities lurking in an application and are most effective at different times in the software lifecycle. They each represent different tradeoffs of time, effort, cost and vulnerabilities found.

 Design review. Before code is written the application's architecture and design can be reviewed for security problems. A common technique in this phase is the creation of a threat model.
 Whitebox security review, or code review. This is a security engineer deeply understanding the application through manually reviewing the source code and noticing security flaws. Through comprehension of the application, vulnerabilities unique to the application can be found. 
 Blackbox security audit. This is only through the use of an application testing it for security vulnerabilities, no source code is required.
 Automated Tooling. Many security tools can be automated through inclusion into the development or testing environment. Examples of those are automated DAST/SAST tools that are integrated into code editor or CI/CD platforms.
 Coordinated vulnerability platforms. These are hacker-powered application security solutions offered by many websites and software developers by which individuals can receive recognition and compensation for reporting bugs.

Web application security 

Web application security is a branch of information security that deals specifically with the security of websites, web applications, and web services. At a high level, web application security draws on the principles of application security but applies them specifically to the internet and web systems.

Web Application Security Tools are specialized tools for working with HTTP traffic, e.g., Web application firewalls.

Security threats 

The Open Web Application Security Project (OWASP) provides free and open resources. It is led by a non-profit called The OWASP Foundation. The OWASP Top 10 - 2017 results from recent research based on comprehensive data compiled from over 40 partner organizations. This data revealed approximately 2.3 million vulnerabilities across over 50,000 applications. According to the OWASP Top 10 - 2021, the ten most critical web application security risks include:

 Broken access control
 Cryptographic Failures
 Injection
 Insecure Design
 Security Misconfiguration
 Vulnerable and Outdated Components
 Identification and Authentification Failures
 Software and Data Integrity Failures
 Security Logging and Monitoring Failures*
 Server-Side Request Forgery (SSRF)*

Tooling for security testing

Security testing techniques scour for vulnerabilities or security holes in applications. These vulnerabilities leave applications open to exploitation. Ideally, security testing is implemented throughout the entire Software Development Life Cycle (SDLC) so that vulnerabilities may be addressed in a timely and thorough manner.

There are many kinds of automated tools for identifying vulnerabilities in applications. Common tool categories used for identifying application vulnerabilities include:
 Static Application Security Testing (SAST) analyzes source code for security vulnerabilities during an application's development. Compared to DAST, SAST can be utilized even before the application is in an executable state. As SAST has access to the full source code it is a white-box approach. This can yield more detailed results but can result in many false positives that need to be manually verified.
 Dynamic Application Security Testing (DAST, often called Vulnerability scanners) automatically detects vulnerabilities by crawling and analyzing websites. This method is highly scalable, easily integrated and quick. DAST tools are well suited for dealing with low-level attacks such as injection flaws but are not well suited to detect high-level flaws, e.g., logic or business logic flaws. Fuzzing tools are commonly used for input testing.
 Interactive Application Security Testing (IAST) assesses applications from within using software instrumentation. This combines the strengths of both SAST and DAST methods as well as providing access to code, HTTP traffic, library information, backend connections and configuration information. Some IAST products require the application to be attacked, while others can be used during normal quality assurance testing.
 Runtime application self-protection augments existing applications to provide intrusion detection and prevention from within an application runtime.
 Dependency scanners (also called Software Composition Analysis) try to detect the usage of software components with known vulnerabilities. These tools can either work on-demand, e.g., during the source code build process, or periodically.
Abstraction is the idea of making more complex things less complex.

Security standards and regulations
 CERT Secure Coding
 ISO/IEC 27034-1:2011 Information technology — Security techniques — Application security -- Part 1: Overview and concepts
 ISO/IEC TR 24772:2013 Information technology — Programming languages — Guidance to avoiding vulnerabilities in programming languages through language selection and use
 NIST Special Publication 800-53
 OWASP ASVS: Web Application Security Verification Standard

See also
 Application service architecture (ASA)
 Common Weakness Enumeration
 Data security
 Mobile security
 OWASP
 Microsoft Security Development Lifecycle
 Usable security

References

Mobile security
Data security